Colonel Henry James Baillie PC (1803 – 16 December 1885), was a British Conservative politician. He served under Lord Derby as Under-Secretary of State for India from 1858 to 1859.

Background
Baillie was the son of Colonel Hugh Duncan Baillie, son of Evan Baillie, by his first wife Elizabeth, daughter of Reverend Henry Reynett. Peter Baillie and James Evan Baillie were his uncles. He was educated at Eton College.

Political career
Baillie was a friend of Benjamin Disraeli, and in 1835 was actually called upon by Disraeli to serve as his second (after d'Orsay declined), when it appeared that Disraeli and Morgan O'Connell, the son of Daniel O'Connell, were going to fight a duel, which apparently did not actually occur. In 1840 Baillie was elected Member of Parliament for Inverness-shire, and retained that seat until 1868. In the early 1840s he was associated with the  "Young England" movement, of which Disraeli was the head. Another member of that group, George Smythe, was Baillie's brother-in-law. He apparently broke with Sir Robert Peel over the Corn Laws and accepted minor office in Lord Derby's 1852 government as Joint Secretary to the Board of Control. He again held office under Derby as Under-Secretary of State for India from 1858 to 1859. In 1866 he was sworn of the Privy Council.

Family

Baillie married firstly the Honourable Philippa Eliza Sydney Smythe, daughter of Percy Smythe, 6th Viscount Strangford, in 1840. They had several children. After Philippa's death in June 1854 he married secondly Clarissa Rush, daughter of George Rush, in 1857. Baillie died at the age of 82 and was buried in the Baillie family vault in the Lebanon Circle on the west side of Highgate Cemetery.

References

External links 
 

1803 births
1885 deaths
Burials at Highgate Cemetery
People educated at Eton College
Members of the Parliament of the United Kingdom for Highland constituencies
Scottish Tory MPs (pre-1912)
UK MPs 1837–1841
UK MPs 1841–1847
UK MPs 1847–1852
UK MPs 1852–1857
UK MPs 1857–1859
UK MPs 1859–1865
UK MPs 1865–1868
Members of the Privy Council of the United Kingdom